James Brian Elsner (born  1959) is an American atmospheric scientist, geographer, and applied statistician who has made substantial contributions to understanding of the spatial, temporal, and physical relationships of tropical cyclones and tornadoes, and the influence of climate change.

Elsner earned a B.S. (1981), M.S. (1984), and Ph.D. (1988) from the University of Wisconsin–Milwaukee (UWM). He joined the faculty of Florida State University (FSU) in 1990 as an assistant professor in the Department of Meteorology and moved to the Department of Geography in 1998 where he has held his current position as the Earl and Sophia Shaw Professor since 2008. He has been President of Climatek, Inc., since 2001. Elsner organized the biannual International Summit on Hurricanes and Climate Change in 2001 and the International Summit on Tornadoes and Climate Change, the first scientific conference on the topic, in 2014. He is a storm chaser and leads a FSU storm intercept program. He is member of the American Association of Geographers (AAG), the American Geophysical Union (AGU), and the American Meteorological Society (AMS).

See also
 Harold E. Brooks

References

External links
 FSU Geography profile
 Hurricane and Tornado Climate FSU data site and blog
 Twitter account

American meteorologists
American climatologists
American geographers
American statisticians
University of Wisconsin–Milwaukee alumni
Florida State University faculty
Storm chasers
1959 births
Living people